Bakhtyar Khudojnazarov (Russian/) (May 29, 1965 – April 21, 2015) was a film director, producer and screenwriter from Tajikistan. His most internationally famous film is the comedy Luna Papa (1999). He won a Silver Lion at the Venice Film Festival for his film Kosh ba kosh (1993). In 2000 he was a member of the jury at the 22nd Moscow International Film Festival.

Khudojnazarov lived in Berlin, Germany, from 1993 and died from a short illness aged 49.

Filmography
Brother (Братан, 1991)
Kosh ba kosh (Кош-ба-кош, 1993)
Luna Papa (Лунный папа, 1999)
The Suit (Шик, 2003)
Tanker Tango (Танкер Танго, 2006)
Waiting for the Sea (В ожидании моря, 2012)
Hetaera of Major Sokolov (Гетеры майора Соколова, 2014) (TV mini series)

References

External links

Gerasimov Institute of Cinematography alumni
Tajikistani film directors
1965 births
2015 deaths